is a Japanese rower. She competed in the women's coxless pair event at the 1992 Summer Olympics.

References

1969 births
Living people
Japanese female rowers
Olympic rowers of Japan
Rowers at the 1992 Summer Olympics
Place of birth missing (living people)
Asian Games medalists in rowing
Rowers at the 1990 Asian Games
Asian Games silver medalists for Japan
Medalists at the 1990 Asian Games
20th-century Japanese women